MSCW may refer to:

 Mississippi University for Women
 MoSCoW method for assigning priority in software development projects